Wadsworth Harris (October 9, 1864 – November 1, 1942) was an American actor of the silent era. He appeared in more than 40 films between 1911 and 1936. He was born in Boston, Massachusetts and died in Los Angeles, California from pneumonia.

Filmography

External links

1864 births
1942 deaths
American male film actors
American male silent film actors
Male actors from Boston
Deaths from pneumonia in California
20th-century American male actors